The Koyanagawa clan (小梁川氏, Koyanagawa-shi) was a samurai family in Japan descending from the Date clan, a daimyo (feudal lord) family in Mutsu Province.

History 
The third son of Date Mochimune, the 11th head of the Date clan, Date Morimune (1440 - November 19, 1500), took the name Koyanagawa from Koyanagawa, Date-gun, Mutsu Province.

According to Date Seishin Kafu, Morimune gathered the Date clan vassals and led all the officials during the time when the 13th clan head, Morimune's nephew, Date Naomune, was aged from 3 to 15 (1455-1467). However, this is considered impossible because not only the elder brother and 12th clan head, Date Narimune, but also Date Mochimune (died in 1469) were still alive at this time.

In 1591, Date Masamune moved to Iwadeyama due to the Kasai Ōsaki Rebel, when the old territories of Nagai and Date were seized. At this time, Morimune also moved to Esashi-gun. During the Edo period, the Koyagawa clan further moved to Notezaki within the same province, and after that, the clan ruled the area until the Meiji Restoration.

Genealogy 
The Koyanagawa clan descends from Fujiwara no Yamakage's line of the Fujiwara clan's Hokke house through the Date clan. The patriarch of the Koyanagawa clan, Koyanagawa Morimune, was the third son of Date Mochimune, the 11th head of the Date clan.

Clan heads 

 Koyanagawa Morimune
 Koyanagawa Chikatomo
 Koyanagawa Chikamune
 Koyanagawa Morimune
 Koyanagawa Muneshige
 Koyanagawa Munekage
 Koyanagawa Muneyoshi　
 Koyanagawa Munehide
 Date Muraoki
 Koyanagawa Munenaga
 Koyanagawa Muneshige
 Koyanagawa Moriaki
 Koyanagawa Morisane
 Koyanagawa Moriaki
 Koyanagawa Yasumori
 Koyanagawa Moriyuki (later Date Kunimori)

See also 

 Date clan

References 

Japanese clans
Date clan